Wharf Theatre (or Theater) may refer to:

Wharf Theater, a theatre company and venue in Monterey, California
Wharf Theatre, a theatre venue in Sydney, Australia
Wharf Theatre, an early venue used by the Provincetown Players
Long Wharf Theatre, a theatre company and venue in New Haven, Connecticut